Fairfield Municipal Airport  is a public airport located three miles (5 km) northwest of the central business district of Fairfield, a city in Jefferson County, Iowa, United States. It is owned by the City of Fairfield.

Facilities and aircraft 

For the 12-month period ending November 15, 2005, the airport had 9,380 aircraft operations, an average of 25 per day: 89% general aviation, 9% military and 2% air taxi. There are 36 aircraft based at this airport: 81% single engine, 8% multi-engine, 3% jet and 8% ultralight.

Historical aircraft 
A former USAF F-84F Thunderstreak is on static display near the airport terminal.

References

External links 

Airports in Iowa
Transportation buildings and structures in Jefferson County, Iowa